Solon Ben Wixler (born January 4, 1977) is an American indie rock musician. He was Guitarist for the bands Thirty Seconds to Mars (2001-2003) and Earlimart. He is currently the lead male vocal and guitar player in the band Great Northern.

Early life

He was born Solon Ben Wixler to a musically inclined family, whose musical past included a band called The Wild Blue Yonder, which included his parents and uncle. Solon started to play drums at the age of four. 

Music was heavily involved in Solon and his brother's lives. His mother died in the early 1980s. His father later remarried and had another child.

On October 11, 2014 he married Rachel Stolte.

Music

In 2001, Solon joined Thirty Seconds to Mars playing guitar. He left the band in 2003 due to issues related to touring. Since 30 Seconds to Mars, Solon has played in a revolving array of bands such as All Smiles, Earlimart and Sea Wolf. 

Over the years Solon and Rachel Stolte had been trading music recorded on their own four-track recorders. Eventually this led to creation of Great Northern. Solon, in order to get a band together, asked Davey Latter to join. Latter originally played bass guitar but later moved to drums when Ashley Dzerigian joined.

References

1977 births
Living people
Thirty Seconds to Mars members
American rock musicians
Musicians from California